Meilland International SA is a family-owned rose growing business founded circa 1850. The business operates today out of the Domaine de Saint André in Le Cannet-des-Maures, Le Luc en Provence, Var, France with branches all over the world.

History

The Meilland Family is a multi-generational family of French rose breeders. The family's first rosarian was gardener, Joseph Rambaux, who first started breeding roses in 1850 in Lyon. He is best known for developing the Polyantha 'Perle d'Or'. His wife, Claudine and son-in-law, Francois Dubreuil, took over the family nursery after Rambaux died in 1878. Debreuil became a successful rose breeder and grower. In 1900, Dubreuil hired sixteen year old, Antoine Meilland, as a gardening assistant, working alongside Dubreuil's daughter, Claudia. Antoine and Claudia married in 1909 and their son, Francis was born in 1912. The couple took over Dubareuil's nursery after his death in 1916.

After World War I, Antoine and Claudia bought property in Tassin-la-Demi-Lune, near Lyon and started a new nursery. Their son, Francis, married Marie-Louise (Louisette) Paolino, daughter of an Italian rose breeder. Francis grew the nursery into a large, international company, and became the most famous and prolific rose breeder in the family. His legendary 'Peace' rose, brought the family international attention and great commercial success  it was introduced after World War II. The Meilland family merged their business with Francisque Richardier in 1946, so that Francis Meilland could focus solely on breeding roses.

After Francis's early death in 1958, Louisette continued to breed roses, introducing many awarding winning new varieties. The new company, Meilland-Richardier grew into Meilland International (AKA House of Meilland), and is located in Le Luc en Provence, France. Francis and Louisette's children, Alain and Michelle, were both successful rose breeders and took over management of the company when Louisette retired. In 1978, Jacques Mouchotte was promoted to Director of Research of the company's rose breeding program. He developed a large number of new rose cultivars during his years at Meilland International. 
Some of his most popular rose varieties are 'Bonica 82', 'Debut', 'Carefree Wonder', 'Black Baccara' and 'Carefree Delight'. Meilland International continues to be 100% family owned and managed.

House of Meilland
Meilland Richardier grew into the large international rose growing business, the House of Meilland, also known as Meilland International. The company's headquarters are located in Le Luc en Provence, France. The company is owned entirely by the Meilland and Richardier families. The House of Meilland, has three divisions: Meilland International, which creates new rose varieties; Meilland Richardier, which grows and sells commercial roses worldwide; and Selection New Plant (SNP), which finds and acquires innovative varieties of ornamental plants.

The company employs over 800 people worldwide and owns rose trial gardens and test stations in France, the U.S. and Germany. Meilland International sells over 12 million rose plants each year. The company is managed by Alain Meilland and Michell Richardier Meilland, who are also rose breeders for Meilland International. The company's rose breeding program has been led by Jacques Mouchotte since 1978.

Roses

Notes

Sources
 
  
 

Horticultural companies of France
Rose breeders
1850s establishments in France
Companies established in the 1850s
Companies based in Provence-Alpes-Côte d'Azur